Hughes Glacier is a small alpine glacier flowing toward Lake Bonney in Taylor Valley from the Kukri Hills on the south, in Victoria Land, Antarctica. It was mapped by the Western Geological Party led by Thomas Griffith Taylor of the British Antarctic Expedition, 1910–13, and named for Professor McKenny Hughes, a geologist at the University of Cambridge.

References

Glaciers of McMurdo Dry Valleys